Vjaczeslav Motorczuk (born February 9, 1992) is a Ukrainian professional basketball player for Budivelnyk Kyiv of the UA SuperLeague.

September 13, 2015 signed a contract with BC Budivelnyk

External links
 FIBA Europe
 Sergiy Gorbenko at basketball.eurobasket.com

References 

BC Budivelnyk players
Ukrainian men's basketball players
1981 births
Living people
BC Khimik players
BC Politekhnika-Halychyna players
BC Odesa players
Power forwards (basketball)
Sportspeople from Odesa